Marius Willsch (born 18 March 1991) is a German professional footballer who plays as a right midfielder for 1860 Munich.

Career
Willsch began his career with 1860 Munich, and was promoted to the reserve team in 2010. He made 50 appearances in the Regionalliga Süd over the next two years, scoring three times. In July 2012 he signed for SpVgg Unterhaching of the 3. Liga, alongside team-mates Daniel Hofstetter and Marcel Kappelmaier. He left Unterhaching after two seasons and signed for 1. FC Saarbrücken.

Career statistics

References

External links

1991 births
Living people
German footballers
Association football midfielders
TSV 1860 Munich II players
SpVgg Unterhaching players
1. FC Saarbrücken players
1. FC Schweinfurt 05 players
TSV 1860 Munich players
3. Liga players
People from Passau
Sportspeople from Lower Bavaria
Footballers from Bavaria